Mamdouh Kashlan (born 1929 in Damascus) is a Syrian painter. He has held more than 300 exhibitions in Syria and around the world and many of his paintings are on display in the National museums of Damascus, Aleppo and  Deir Atieh and the presidential palace. His work is also on display in the Sorsoq Museum in Beirut, Lebanon, Modern art museum in Cairo, Egypt and has been displayed in Sofia, Bulgaria, Paris and Seinajoki, Finland. In 1996 he was awarded the pioneers prize from the ministry of culture.

References
Syrian Art Directory

Syrian painters
1929 births
Living people
People from Damascus
Syrian artists